Tillie Creek is a tributary of the North Fork of the Kern River, in the Southern Sierra Nevada, Kern County, California.

Since the Kern River was dammed in the Kern River Valley, the creek's mouth is now on Lake Isabella reservoir in Wofford Heights.

Kern River
Kern River Valley
Rivers of Kern County, California
Rivers of the Sierra Nevada (United States)
Rivers of Southern California
Rivers of the Sierra Nevada in California